The 1999 Nairobi Agreement was a deal signed by Presidents Yoweri Museveni of Uganda and Omar al-Bashir of Sudan in Nairobi, Kenya, on 8 December 1999. The deal was brokered by former US president Jimmy Carter.

Conditions
The governments of Uganda and Sudan agreed to respect each other's territorial integrity, renounce use of force in settling differences, return prisoners of war from respective countries and generally work to disarming rebel groups within their own territory and refusing support towards rebel groups operating in each other's territory.

References

Implementing the 1999 Nairobi Agreement, Oguru Otto, from Protracted conflict, elusive peace - Initiatives to end the violence in northern Uganda, editor Okello Lucima, Accord issue 11, Conciliation Resources, 2002

Politics of Sudan
History of Nairobi
1999 in Kenya
1999 in Sudan
1999 in Uganda
Treaties of Uganda
Treaties of the Republic of the Sudan (1985–2011)
Treaties concluded in 1999
Treaties entered into force in 1999
Sudan–Uganda relations
1990s in Nairobi
Jimmy Carter
Yoweri Museveni